= Four runs =

Four runs may refer to:

- In cricket, four runs are scored when the ball touches the boundary or the ground beyond it after bouncing in the field
- In baseball, four runs is the maximum number of runs that can be scored in a single play, via a grand slam home run
